Someone to Run With (מישהו לרוץ איתו / Mishehu laruts ito, 2000) is a thriller novel by Israeli writer David Grossman. The English edition was published by London by Bloomsbury in 2003, .

The book has received several reviews in international press.

The book was adapted into a film in 2006 of the same name.

In 2019 the book was banned in Russia.

References

2000 novels
20th-century Israeli novels
Israeli novels adapted into films
Book censorship in Russia
Censored books